Brumaire was the second month in the French Republican calendar. The month was named after the French word for fog, brume, fog occurring frequently in France at that time of the year.

Brumaire was the second month of the autumn quarter (mois d'automne). It started between 22 October and 24 October. It ended between 20 November and 22 November. It follows the Vendémiaire and precedes the Frimaire.

In political/historical usage, Brumaire can refer to the coup of 18 Brumaire in the year VIII (9 November 1799), by which General Napoleon Bonaparte overthrew the government of the Directory to replace it with the Consulate, as referenced by Karl Marx in his pamphlet, The Eighteenth Brumaire of Louis Bonaparte, in which Marx parallels Napoleon's original coup with the later 1851 Coup of his nephew, Louis-Napoleon.

Day name table 

Like all FRC months Brumaire lasted 30 days and was divided into three 10-day weeks called décades (decades). Every day had the name of an agricultural plant, except the 5th (Quintidi) and 10th day (Decadi) of every decade, which had the name of a domestic animal (Quintidi) or an agricultural tool (Decadi).

Conversion table

External links 

 Autumn Quarter of Year II (facsimile)

French Republican calendar
October
November

sv:Franska revolutionskalendern#Månaderna